Arnošt Goldflam (born 22 September 1946 in Brno) is a Czech playwright, writer, director, screenwriter, and actor. He appeared in more than thirty films between 1986 and 2011.

Selected filmography

External links
 
 

1946 births
Living people
Actors from Brno
20th-century Czech dramatists and playwrights
Czech male dramatists and playwrights
Czech male film actors
Czech male stage actors
Czech male television actors
Czech Jews
Jewish Czech actors
Drama teachers
Writers from Brno